Millertown is an unincorporated community in Perry County, in the U.S. state of Ohio.

History
Millertown was laid out in 1834 by Jacob Miller, and named for him.

References

Unincorporated communities in Perry County, Ohio
Unincorporated communities in Ohio
1834 establishments in Ohio